Miloš Vulić (born 19 August 1996) is a Serbian professional footballer who plays as a midfielder for Italian  club Perugia.

Club career

Napredak
Vulić began playing football in his hometown, with the youth system of Napredak Kruševac before debuting for them professionally. On 5 May 2018, he made an assist and scored a goal in a 2-2 tie with Partizan. Over the course of the 2017–18 season, he scored a total of five goals in 30 games played and was also the team's captain.

Red Star Belgrade
Vulić signed a three-year contract with Red Star Belgrade on 21 December 2018. On 18 September 2019, he made his UEFA Champions League debut when he came on as a substitute in a 3-0 loss to Bayern Munich.

Crotone
Vulić signed a three-year contract with Crotone on 5 September 2020.

Perugia
On 20 July 2022, Vulić moved to Perugia.

International career
He made his debut for Serbia national football team on 7 June 2021 in a friendly against Jamaica.

Career statistics

Club

International

Honours
Napredak Kruševac
Serbian First League: 2012–13, 2015–16

Red Star Belgrade
Serbian SuperLiga: 2018–19, 2019–20

References

1996 births
Living people
Sportspeople from Kruševac
Association football midfielders
Serbian footballers
FK Napredak Kruševac players
Red Star Belgrade footballers
F.C. Crotone players
A.C. Perugia Calcio players
Serbian First League players
Serbian SuperLiga players
Serie A players
Serie B players
Serbian expatriate footballers
Expatriate footballers in Italy
Serbian expatriate sportspeople in Italy
Serbia international footballers